Salma Zahid  is a Canadian politician, who was elected as a Member of Parliament in the House of Commons of Canada to represent the federal riding of Scarborough Centre during the 2015 Canadian federal election. She succeeded the Conservative Roxanne James.

Early life and career 
Zahid was born in Coventry. She holds a master's degree in educational management and administration from the University of London’s Institute of Education, and an MBA from Quaid e Azam University in Pakistan.[3] She is Pakistani Canadian, mother of 2 and has resided in Scarborough since 2000.[4] She is a recipient of the Queen Elizabeth II Diamond Jubilee Medal.[5] Zahid was a community organizer and worked for the Government of Ontario in multiple positions before running in the election.[6]

Politics 
Zahid was elected in the 2015 Canadian federal election as a Member of Parliament for Scarborough Centre (electoral district). While in the 42nd Parliament, Zahid had the role of Vice-Chair for the Standing Committee on the Status of Women, where she was a spokesperson for racialized women.

In February 2018, Zahid announced that she was taking medical leave to treat her Stage 4 Non-Hodgkin lymphoma. This was used by the Scarborough Centre Conservative Party of Canada Riding Association Vice President to sell memberships via robocall. While recovering from chemotherapy treatment, Zahid wore a hijab for personal reasons, saying that she had grown closer to her Islamic faith while facing cancer. In May 2018, she became the first MP to wear a hijab in the House of Commons. Zahid received some negative reactions to the hijab, to which she responded by highlighting the personal nature of her decision. In July 2018, after completing six rounds of chemotherapy, Zahid was cancer-free and returned to her job.

Zahid was re-nominated to run in Scarborough Centre for the Liberals in the 2019 Canadian federal election.

Past election results

References

External links

Living people
Liberal Party of Canada MPs
Members of the House of Commons of Canada from Ontario
Women members of the House of Commons of Canada
People from Scarborough, Toronto
Politicians from Toronto
Ontario civil servants
Women in Ontario politics
Canadian politicians of Pakistani descent
Quaid-i-Azam University alumni
Pakistani emigrants to Canada
Naturalized citizens of Canada
21st-century Canadian women politicians
Year of birth missing (living people)